Francisco José Terciado Sacedo (born 25 March 1981 in Fuentidueña de Tajo) is a Spanish former professional racing cyclist.

Palmarès
2009
1st Vuelta a Navarra
1st Stage 4

References

1981 births
Living people
Spanish male cyclists
People from Las Vegas (comarca)
Cyclists from the Community of Madrid